Eriocheir is a genus of crabs, including the Chinese mitten crab, E. sinensis. Formerly in the family Grapsidae, it is now placed in the Varunidae.

References

Grapsoidea
Taxa named by Wilhem de Haan